Alkannin is a natural dye that is obtained from the extracts of plants from the borage family Alkanna tinctoria that are found in the south of France. The dye is used as a food colouring and in cosmetics. It is used as a red-brown food additive in regions such as Australia. Alkannin is deep red in an acid and blue in an alkaline environment. The chemical structure as a naphthoquinone derivative was first determined by Brockmann in 1936. The R-enantiomer of alkannin is known as shikonin, and the racemic mixture of the two is known as shikalkin.

Biosynthesis 
The enzyme 4-hydroxybenzoate geranyltransferase utilises geranyl diphosphate and 4-hydroxybenzoate to produce 3-geranyl-4-hydroxybenzoate and diphosphate. These compounds are then used to form alkannin.

Research 
Because the root bark (cork layers) of this plant contains large amounts of red naphthoquinone pigments, the roots of these plants are red-purple. If shikonin is extracted from fresh tissues, it gradually darkens over several days, finally forming black precipitates, which are thought to be polymers.

References

External links 

 Shikonin at Sigma-Aldrich

Food colorings
1,4-Naphthoquinones
Terpeno-phenolic compounds
Articles containing video clips
Hydroxynaphthoquinones
Secondary alcohols
3-Hydroxypropenals within hydroxyquinones
Alkene derivatives